The Santo Domingo Church (Spanish: Iglesia de Santo Domingo) is a Dominican church in the historical downtown of Santiago de Chile. It is located at the corner of Santo Domingo Street and 21 de Mayo Street.

History
The present structure is the fourth church built on the same site to house the Dominican congregation in Santiago. Earthquakes in 1595, 1647, and 1730 destroyed the early churches. 

The fourth church began to be constructed in 1747 under the design of architect Juan de los Santos Vasconcellos. Joaquín Toesca worked on its construction between 1795 and 1796.

The church has suffered two important fires. The first occurred in 1895 and the second fire occurred in 1963, which destroyed the interior of the church.

Architecture 
The main body of the church is built in ashlar masonry. The bell towers are constructed of clay brick masonry covered with stucco. The front facade features pilasters and statues set in niches. The attic is surmounted by three statues.

See also
Roman Catholicism in Chile

References

Churches in Santiago, Chile
Roman Catholic churches in Chile